Alzano Scrivia is a comune (municipality) in the Province of Alessandria in the Italian region Piedmont, located about  east of Turin and about  northeast of Alessandria.

Alzano Scrivia borders the following municipalities: Castelnuovo Scrivia, Guazzora, Isola Sant'Antonio, and Molino dei Torti.

The 18th-century Church of the Nativity of Mary host paintings of Giovani Marcello Zampollini (1888-1948), Pietro Mietta, Alessandro silla and Domenico Fossati.

Demographic evolution

References

Cities and towns in Piedmont
Articles which contain graphical timelines